The Paton and Hannah Wilson House is a historic building located north of Salem, Iowa, United States. Built by 1839, this single story Greek Revival is one of the oldest brick residences in Salem Township.  Paton, or Payton, served in both the Iowa territorial legislature (1840-1842) and the Iowa state legislature (1850-1852).  He advocated for the rights of all people, including citizens of color.  Hannah was a charter member of Salem Monthly Meeting (Quakers).  The Wilson's estate sold the house to Reuben and Abigail Hallowell in 1875, and their descendants continued to own it into the 21st century.  The house was listed on the National Register of Historic Places in 2010.

References

Houses completed in 1839
Greek Revival architecture in Iowa
Houses in Henry County, Iowa
National Register of Historic Places in Henry County, Iowa
Houses on the National Register of Historic Places in Iowa